Poetry Wales is a triannual poetry magazine published in Bridgend, Wales. Founded by Meic Stephens and now published by Seren, it is edited by Zoë Brigley. Since its first publication in 1965, the magazine has built an international reputation for excellent poems, features and reviews from Wales and beyond. The magazine is published in print and online.

History
Poetry Wales was founded by Meic Stephens in 1965, and has since been edited by Sam Adams, John Powell Ward, Cary Archard, Mike Jenkins, Richard Poole, Robert Minhinnick, Zoë Skoulding, Nia Davies and Jonathan Edwards. In August 2021, the magazine appointed its first ever joint editors in Zoë Brigley and Marvin Thompson. However, Thompson stepped down from the role three weeks later. Since then, Brigley has introduced a scheme where a series of contributing editors join the magazine for a couple of issues, including Vicky Morris, Isabelle Baafi, Hannah Hodgson, Taylor Edmonds, and Grug Muse. 

Former guest editors of individual issues include Deryn Rees-Jones, Stephen Knight, Gwyneth Lewis, Paul Henry and Duncan Bush.

Former editor Cary Archard also founded Poetry Wales Press, which now trades under the name Seren Books.

Poetry Wales is supported by Swansea University and has a Creative Partnership with Aberystwyth University's Institute of Literature, Languages and Creative Arts. Along with two other literary magazines in Wales, New Welsh Review and Planet, Poetry Wales receives funding from the Welsh Books Council.

Recent Issues 
Poetry Wales has published 212 issues and counting of its magazine. The magazine is published in yearly volumes, previously over 4 seasonal issues, and now over 3 issues published in Winter, Spring and Summer.

Wales Poetry Award 
In August 2019, Poetry Wales launched its annual international poetry competition Wales Poetry Award, sponsored by Aberystwyth University. The competition is open to all poets aged 17+ and accepts English language poetry up to 70 lines. Its inaugural award winners were announced at Seren Cardiff Poetry Festival in February 2020, with Leo Temple taking first prize for 'Towards a Bucolics of Contactless: a particular poem'.

See also
List of literary magazines

References

External links
Poetry Wales website

Quarterly magazines published in the United Kingdom
Magazines established in 1965
Poetry magazines published in the United Kingdom
Literary magazines published in Wales
Triannual magazines published in the United Kingdom